The 1959 Austrian Alpine Ski Championships (Österreichischen Alpinen Skimeisterschaften 1959) took place from 27 February to 1 March in Kitzbühel.

Men

Downhill 

Date: 28 February 1959
Place: Kitzbühel
Piste: Streif
Run length: 3,600 m
Gates: 17

Giant slalom 

Date: 27 February 1959
Place: Kitzbühel
Piste: Hausberg

Slalom 

Date: 1 March 1959
Place: Kitzbühel
Piste: Ganslernhang

Combination 
The combination combines the results of the slalom, giant slalom and downhill.

Ladies

Downhill 

Date: 28 February 1959
Place: Kitzbühel
Piste: Seidlalm

Giant slalom 

Date: 27 February 1959
Place: Kitzbühel

Slalom 

Date: 1 March 1959
Place: Kitzbühel

Combination 
The combination combines the results of the slalom, giant slalom and downhill.

References 

1959 in alpine skiing
1959 in Austrian sport
Kitzbühel
Kitzbühel Alps
Alpine skiing competitions in Austria